Wild World may refer to:
"Wild World" (song), a 1970 song by Cat Stevens
Wild World (Bastille album), 2016
Wild World (Kip Moore album), 2020
Animal Crossing: Wild World, a 2005 life-simulation video game for the Nintendo DS
Wild World, a former name for the Six Flags America amusement park in Woodmore, Maryland

See also
WILD World Championship, a U.S. women's wrestling promotion
Wild World of Spike, a 2007 TV series